Jordan Mackenzie Thompson (born May 5, 1997) is an American volleyball player for the United States women's national volleyball team and Italian Serie A1 team Vero Volley Milano. Thompson played collegiate volleyball with the University of Cincinnati Bearcats from 2015 to 2019. Thompson won gold with the national team at the 2020 Tokyo Summer Olympics.

Personal life

Thompson was born in Edina, Minnesota, to parents Tyrone Doleman and Mary Thompson. Her father also had an athletic career, as he played basketball at the University of Pittsburgh at Johnstown, with the Harlem Globetrotters and eight years professionally overseas. Her uncle was Pro Football Hall of Famer Chris Doleman.

Thompson initially played basketball in middle school, but became frustrated with it and decided to try volleyball. After just two years of club volleyball, she got her first NCAA Division I scholarship offer.

She attended Edina High School where she was a four year letterwinner, won two conference championships (2011, 2012) and led the team in blocks and kills during her senior season. She first played club volleyball at Club 43, but then transferred to Northern Lights, leading them to an AAU 17 Open title.

Thompson is a Christian. She was married to Blake Yager, and is now in a relationship with NFL player Stephen Weatherly.

Career

Cincinnati

Thompson played college volleyball for Cincinnati, where she was the a three time unanimous American Athletic Conference player of the year and a two time AVCA All-American, garnering first-team honors as well as North Region Player of the Year in her redshirt senior season in 2019. In a win over Connecticut on Nov. 3, 2019, she had 50 kills in the match which is the most kills ever in a NCAA Division I match since the rally-scoring era began. 

Thompson's volleyball career almost ended before she could finish out her college career when she suffered a UCL injury in her elbow during practice. She successfully underwent Tommy John surgery and recovered from her injury, returning to play after taking a redshirt season in 2017.

In her final season, she led Cincinnati to the 2019 NCAA Division I women's volleyball tournament Sweet Sixteen round, where they lost in a close five set match to Penn State. It was the first time any school from the American Athletic Conference made it into the Sweet Sixteen round of the NCAA tournament. She finished her collegiate career ranked seventh all-time in career kills in NCAA history and led the nation in kills, points, kills per set and points per set. She is the all-time leader in career kills at Cincinnati.

Professional clubs 

Thompson signed her first professional volleyball contract in 2019 began when she played for Turkish club Fenerbahçe. She then signed with Eczacıbaşı VitrA, another club from Turkey, for the 2020–2021 season. She was named best outside hitter in the 2020 Turkish Super Cup, helping Eczacıbaşı VitrA to the Turkish League Title. Although she was to play another season with Eczacıbaşı VitrA in 2021–2022, she parted ways with the team by mutual agreement in the early stages of the season. Thompson returned to the United States to continue treatment for the ankle injury she sustained during the 2020 Olympics.

In June 2022, Italian Serie A1 team Vero Volley Milano announced that Thompson would join the team for the 2022–2023 season.

USA National Team

Thompson's first major tournament play with the USA National Team came in 2019 during the 2020 Summer Olympics qualifier tournament, where she helped Team USA qualify for the Olympics. She was one of just three players on Team USA’s qualifying roster with collegiate eligibility, and was the only one of the three to see playing time.

She was chosen to represent USA at the 2019 FIVB Volleyball Women's Nations League, where she scored 33 points versus Brazil in the Finals Round pool play. USA would eventually win the gold medal. After a one year delay due to the 2020 Nations League being cancelled due to the COVID-19 pandemic, she was selected to again represent USA at the 2021 FIVB Volleyball Women's Nations League in May 2021. She had a match high 17 points in USA's sweep of Thailand. USA won the gold medal for the third year in a row after defeating Brazil, 3 sets to 1.

On June 7, 2021, she was named to the 12-player Olympic roster for the 2020 Summer Olympics in Tokyo. In a pool play match against China, Thompson led all players with 34 total points, helping team USA win 3-0 against the defending Olympic champions. After suffering an ankle injury in a pool match against Russia, she did not make an appearance for the remainder of the tournament. Despite Thompson's absence, USA would eventually win the gold medal, the first in program history, after defeating Brazil in straight sets.

In June 2022, Thompson returned to national team competition after recovering from her ankle injury sustained during the 2020 Olympic Games, when she played in the 2022 FIVB Volleyball Women's Nations League tournament. She had 15 points in a win vs. the Dominican Republic.

Thompson was expected to compete in the 2022 FIVB Volleyball Women's World Championship, but did not make the final roster at the last minute due to injury.

Individual Awards

College
2015 American Athletic Conference Freshman of the Year
2015 Unanimous First Team All-American Athletic Conference
2016 AVCA Honorable Mention All-America
2016 AVCA All–Region
2016 First Team All-American Athletic Conference
2016 Unanimous American Athletic Conference Player of the Year
2018 AVCA Third Team All-America
2018 AVCA All–Region
2018 Unanimous American Athletic Conference Player of the Year
2019 CoSida Third Team Academic All-American
2019 Unanimous American Athletic Conference Player of the Year
2019 AVCA All–Region
2019 AVCA First Team All-America
2019 AVCA North Region Player of the Year

International
2020 Turkish Super Cup – Best Outside Hitter

Sources

1997 births
Living people
American women's volleyball players
Sportspeople from Edina, Minnesota
Cincinnati Bearcats women's volleyball players
Expatriate volleyball players in Turkey
American expatriate sportspeople in Turkey
Fenerbahçe volleyballers
Eczacıbaşı volleyball players
American expatriate sportspeople in Italy
Expatriate volleyball players in Italy
Serie A1 (women's volleyball) players
Volleyball players at the 2020 Summer Olympics
Opposite hitters
Outside hitters
People from Edina, Minnesota
University of Cincinnati alumni
Olympic gold medalists for the United States in volleyball
Medalists at the 2020 Summer Olympics